Jung Soo-young is a South Korean actress and model. She is best known for her role in drama Second to Last Love as Go Sang-hee.

Personal life
Jung is married to Shim Jae-rim who is also an actor.

Filmography

Television series

Film

Theater

Awards and nominations
 Nominated for Special Award, Actress in a Romantic-Comedy Drama in 2016 SBS Drama Awards

References

External links 
 

1982 births
Living people
21st-century South Korean actresses
South Korean female models
South Korean television actresses
South Korean film actresses